Mamehlabe is a large village in Ga-Matlala in the Blouberg Local Municipality of the Capricorn District Municipality of the Limpopo province of South Africa. It is located about 10 km northwest of Tibane on the Matlala Road.

Education 
Wingfield Primary School.
Mamehlabe Secondary School.

Sports 
Mamehlabe Brothers F.C.
Mamehlabe Tigers F.C.

References 

Populated places in the Blouberg Local Municipality